Grabonoš ( or ) is a village in the Municipality of Sveti Jurij ob Ščavnici in northeastern Slovenia. The area is part of the traditional Styria region and is now included in the Mura Statistical Region.

A small chapel in the settlement dates to the second half of the 19th century and contains a statue of Saint Mary from around 1900.

References

External links
Grabonoš at Geopedia

Populated places in the Municipality of Sveti Jurij ob Ščavnici